Federal Route 96, or Jalan Simpang Renggam–Benut, is a main federal road in Johor, Malaysia. The road connects the town of Simpang Renggam to Benut in Johor. The road is also a main route to North–South Expressway Southern Route via Simpang Renggam Interchange.

Route background
The Kilometre Zero of the Federal Route 96 starts at Benut, at its interchange with the Federal Route 5, the main trunk road of the west coast of Peninsular Malaysia.

Features
At most sections, the Federal Route 96 was built under the JKR R5 road standard, with a speed limit of 90 km/h.

List of junctions and towns

References

096